Top News is a 24-hour Albanian television news channel.

Top News is owned by Top Media which also owns Top Channel and DigitAlb. Top News is available via DigitAlb on all three of its formats - satellite, terrestrial and via mobile phone and via Home2US in North America.

References

Digitalb television networks
Mass media in Tirana
Television channels and stations established in 2007